Kohatu is a village in Saue Parish, Harju County, Estonia.  It borders Metsanurga village to the north, Mõnuste village to the west, Kernu and Kirikla villages to the south and Rapla County to the east. The territory of the village covers 10.9 km² and had the population of 192 (1 January 2007). Prior to the administrative reform of Estonian local governments in March 2017, the village belonged to Kernu Parish.

References

External links
Pictures of Kohatu and the neighboring village of Kirikla

Villages in Harju County
Kreis Harrien